Boczki may refer to:

Boczki, Łowicz County in Łódź Voivodeship (central Poland)
Boczki, Zduńska Wola County in Łódź Voivodeship (central Poland)
Boczki, Zgierz County in Łódź Voivodeship (central Poland)
Boczki, Warmian-Masurian Voivodeship (north Poland)